The Canton of Latour-de-France is a French former canton of Pyrénées-Orientales department, in Languedoc-Roussillon. It had 5,200 inhabitants (2012). It was disbanded following the French canton reorganisation which came into effect in March 2015. It consisted of 10 communes, which joined the new canton of La Vallée de l'Agly in 2015.

Composition
The canton comprised the following communes:

Latour-de-France 
Bélesta
Caramany
Cassagnes
Estagel
Lansac
Montner
Planèzes
Rasiguères
Tautavel

References

Latour-de-France
2015 disestablishments in France
States and territories disestablished in 2015